Yuhwang ori (유황오리) is a traditional Korean dish, made of duck that has been fed sulfur and is then slow-cooked for up to three hours. The duck is cooked with different medicinal herbs and is believed to have originated in the city of Hanam.

See also
 List of duck dishes

References

Korean cuisine
Duck dishes
Sulfur